This article contains a list of encyclicals of Pope Pius IX.  Pius IX issued 41 papal encyclicals during his reign as pope:

Pius 09
Encyclicals